Hemp is a surname. Notable people with the surname include:

David Hemp (born 1970), Bermudian cricketer
Ducky Hemp (1862–1923), American baseball player
Lauren Hemp (born 2000), English association footballer
Meinhard Hemp (born 1942), German footballer
Tim Hemp (born 1974), Bermudian cricketer
Wilfrid James Hemp (1882–1962), British archaeologist and antiquarian